Gramatikov , feminine:  Gramatikova is a Bulgarian surname. Notable people with the surname include:

Daniel Gramatikov, Bulgarian footballer
Boryana Gramatikova, Bulgaria in the Eurovision Song Contest 2017

See also
Grammatikov, Russian variant
Grammaticus

Bulgarian-language surnames

ru:Грамматиков